Georgy Maksimovich Pushkin, sometimes known as Georgi Pushkin or Grigori Pushkin,
(1909–1963) was an ambassador of the Soviet Union and politician.

He served as ambassador to Hungary beginning in March 1948.

From June to October 1949  he served as Head of the Department of the USSR Ministry of Foreign Affairs, at the same time Chairman of the Radio Broadcasting Committee of the USSR Council of Ministers.

He was ambassador to East Germany.

In 1961, he held the office of Deputy Foreign Minister and was the Soviet delegate to the International Agreement on the Neutrality of Laos.

References

Further reading

telegrams from Averell Harriman mentioning Pushkin
book by Pushkin's daughter (Russian)

Ambassadors of the Soviet Union to Hungary
Ambassadors of the Soviet Union to East Germany
1909 births
1963 deaths